The Communication University of China, Nanjing (CUCN), also known as the Nanguang College of the Communication University of China, is a Nanjing-based private university specialising in the tertiary education for media and communication in Eastern China.

The college was established in September, 2004, jointly funded by Communication University of China and Nanjing Meiya Educational Investment Co. Ltd. The college is directly supervised by the board of directors, with CUC's former president as the honorary head of the board. The campus id located in the university town of Science and Technology Park in Jiangning District of Nanjing, a national-level Hi-Tech Industrial Area.

The college has 10 schools: School of Broadcasting and Hosting, School of Radio and Television, School of Journalism and Communication, School of International Communication, School of Photography, School of Drama and Film, School of Art and Design, School of Animation and Digital Art, School of Cultural Management, School of Media Technology.

References

Universities and colleges in Nanjing
2004 establishments in China
Educational institutions established in 2004
Communication University of China